MathSoft was founded in 1984 by Allen Razdow and David Blohm to provide mathematical programs to students, teachers, and professionals. The company is best known for its Mathcad software, an application for solving and visualizing mathematical problems. The company also created the StudyWorks series of math and science education packages aimed at interactively teaching those subjects to middle school and high school students.

Mathsoft Engineering and Education, Inc., the company that sells these products was one division of the former MathSoft. In 2001, MathSoft sold its Engineering & Education Products Division to the division managers as a privately held company. One of the former MathSoft divisions, FreeScholarships.com, was shut down, and MathSoft renamed itself Insightful. Insightful develops custom math programs for businesses and also sells a data analysis package called StatServer. Mathsoft Engineering & Education continued to develop and sell its flagship Mathcad product as well as the Mathcad Calculation Server, an enterprise server for sharing technical calculations.

Mathsoft Engineering & Education, Inc. promoted the term calculation management which included designing, documenting, and managing technical calculations and intellectual property.

In April 2006, Mathsoft was acquired by Parametric Technology Corporation for $62 million. At the time it had an annual income of $20 million with 130 employees in seven countries, including the UK, Germany and Japan.

References

 All of Mathcad

Software companies based in Massachusetts
Defunct software companies of the United States
American companies established in 1984
1984 establishments in Massachusetts
2006 mergers and acquisitions